Titan FC 28: Brilz vs. Davis  was a mixed martial arts event, held on May 16, 2014 at the First Council Casino Hotel in Newkirk, Oklahoma.

Background
Originally Mike Ricci was slated to take on George Sotiropoulos, but Ricci suffered an injury and the bout was called off and rescheduled for June 6th.

The event was originally scheduled to be headlined by a light heavyweight bout between former UFC vets Vinny Magalhaes and Jason Brilz, However Magalhaes pulled out of the fight and was replaced with Bellator vet Raphael Davis. 

Former UFC vet Daniel Roberts took on Brock Jardine in lightweight fight as the co main event.

Former King of the Cage Junior Welterweight Champion & TUF contestant Ricky Legere faced Todd Moore in a welterweight clash.

Dave Herman was originally scheduled to fight former Bellator & WSOF vet D.J. Linderman, however Linderman pulled out of the bout and was replaced by Kalib Starnes.

Official fight card

See also
Titan Fighting Championships
List of Titan FC events
Titan FC events

References

2014 in mixed martial arts
Mixed martial arts in Oklahoma
Sports in Oklahoma
2014 in sports in Oklahoma
May 2014 sports events in the United States